Cyprus competed at the 2012 Winter Youth Olympics in Innsbruck, Austria. The Cypriot team was made up of one athlete, an alpine skier.

Alpine skiing

Cyprus qualified one boy in alpine skiing.

Boy

See also
Cyprus at the 2012 Summer Olympics

References

Nations at the 2012 Winter Youth Olympics
Cyprus at the Youth Olympics
2012 in Cypriot sport